The 1988 Base Realignment and Closure Commission preliminary list was released by the United States Department of Defense in 1988 as part of the Base Realignment and Closure Commission. It recommended closing 17 major United States military bases.

Commissioners
The commission was made up of the following members:
Chairmen
Jack Edwards
Abraham A. Ribicoff
Members
Louis W. Cabot
W. Graham Claytor, Jr. 
Donald F. Craib, Jr.
Thomas F. Eagleton
Martin R.  Hoffmann
Bryce Poe II 
William H. Rowden
James C. Smith
Donni A. Starry
Russell E. Train

Justifications

Recommendations
Facilities slated for closure/realignment/redirection included:

Alabama Army Ammunition Plant
Army Materials Technology Laboratory
Army Reserve Center Gaithersburg
Bennett Army National Guard Facility
Cameron Station
Cape St. George
Chanute Air Force Base
Coosa River Storage Annex
Coraopolis Family Housing Site 71
Coraopolis Family Housing Site 72
Defense Mapping Agency site Herndon, Virginia
Dry Hill Family Housing
Family Housing Ansonia 04
Family Housing Bedford 85
Family Housing Beverly 15
Family Housing Burlington 84
Family Housing Davisville
Family Housing East Windsor 08
Family Housing Fairfield 65
Family Housing Hull 36
Family Housing Manchester 25
Family Housing Middletown 48
Family Housing Milford 17
Family Housing Nahant 17 
Family Housing New Britain 74
Family Housing North Smithfield 99
Family Housing Orange 15
Family Housing Plainville 67
Family Housing Portland 36
Family Housing Randolph 55
Family Housing Shelton 74
Family Housing Swansea 29
Family Housing Topsfield 05
Family Housing Wakefield 03
Family Housing Westport 73
Former Nike Site at the Aberdeen Proving Ground
Fort Bliss (Realign)
Fort Des Moines
Fort Devens (Realign)
Fort Detrick (Realign)
Fort Dix (Realign)
Fort Douglas
Fort Holabird (Realign)
Fort Meade (Realign)
Fort Monmouth (Realign)
Fort Sheridan
Fort Wingate Ammunition Storage Depot
Fort Wingate
George Air Force Base
Hamilton Army Airfield
Indiana Army Ammunition Plant
Irwin Support Detachment Annex
Jefferson Proving Ground
Kapalama Military Reservation Phase III
Lexington Army Depot
Lexington-Bluegrass Army Depot
Manassas Family Housing
Manhattan Beach Housing
Mather Air Force Base (Redirect)
Midway Housing Site
Navajo Depot Activity
Naval Hospital Philadelphia
Naval Reserve Center Coconut Grove
Naval Station Galveston
Naval Station Lake Charles
Naval Station New York
Naval Station Puget Sound
Naval Station San Francisco (Realign)
New Orleans Military Ocean Terminal
Nike Kansas City 30
Nike New York 01 Housing
Nike New York 25 Housing
Nike New York 54 housing
Nike New York 60 housing
Nike New York 79/80 housing
Nike New York 93/94
Nike New York 99 Housing
Nike Norfolk 85 Housing
Nike Philadelphia 41/43
Nike Washington-Baltimore
Norton Air Force Base
Pease Air Force Base
Pittsburgh 02 Family Housing
Pittsburgh 03 Family Housing
Pittsburgh 25 Family Housing
Pittsburgh 37 Family Housing
Pittsburgh 42 Family Housing
Pittsburgh 43 Family Housing
Pittsburgh 52 Family Housing
Pontiac Storage Facility
Presidio of San Francisco
Pueblo Army Depot (Realign)
Salton Sea Test Base
St. Louis Area Support Center Wherry housing
Sun Prairie Family Housing
Tacony Warehouse
USARC Addison Housing and Worth Family Housing
Umatilla Army Depot (Realign)
Woodbridge Housing Site
Youngs Lake Housing Site

See also
 Loss of Strength Gradient

References

External links
1988 Base Realignment and Closure Commission recommendations 

1988 in the United States
Base Realignment and Closure Commission